Cheadle Airport  is located  northwest of Cheadle, Alberta, Canada.

See also
 List of airports in the Calgary area

References

External links
Page about this airport on COPA's Places to Fly airport directory

Registered aerodromes in Alberta
Wheatland County, Alberta